Lester Crown (born June 7, 1925) is an American businessman and is the son of Chicago financier Henry Crown (died 1990), who created the Material Service Corporation with two brothers in 1919, which merged with General Dynamics in 1959.

Crown has been a perennial member of the Forbes 400 list since 1982.  He controls family holdings, including large stakes in Maytag, Hilton Hotels, Alltel, Aspen Skiing Company, New York's Rockefeller Center, and pro basketball's Chicago Bulls. He also holds a 13% stake in the New York Yankees, an increase from 10% when he was an original limited partner with George Steinbrenner's investment group in 1973. Presumably, the large stake held in Bank One at the time of the 2003 Forbes 400 listing has converted to JPMorgan Chase stock and was derived from an interest in First Chicago Bank, which was enumerated in the 1998 Forbes 400 list as First Chicago NBD shares.  Recent achievements include brokering a controversial agreement to expand O'Hare International Airport, and spearheading the funding of the new Cook County Hospital (Stroger Hospital).  He is the chairman of the Commercial Club of Chicago and Chicago Council on Global Affairs.  His current hometown is Wilmette, Illinois.

Education and career
Crown received a B.S. in chemical engineering from Northwestern University in 1946 and an M.B.A. from Harvard University in 1949.  He was President of Marblehead Lime Co as well as the president of Royal Crown RC Cola from 1956 to 1966.  During the 1950s, the Crown family had a controlling interest in New York's Empire State Building.  He has served as the president and chair of General Dynamics, and currently sits on the Board of Directors of Maytag.  He has been President of Henry Crown & Co. since 1969.  He is a former director of Continental Illinois bank, Trans World Airlines, and Esmark.

Affiliations
Affiliations include: Trusteeship of Northwestern University, the Aspen Institute and the Michael Reese Health Trust.  Crown is on the Board of Directors of Lyric Opera and Children's Memorial Hospital, and the America Abroad Media advisory board. He is a member of Lake Shore Country Club, Northmoor Country Club, Standard Club, Economic Club of Chicago, and Northwestern University's John Evans Club.  He is a Deputy Chair of the International Board of the Weizmann Institute of Science in Israel and a member of the Tel Aviv University's Board of Governors.  Crown is also involved with The Crown Center for Middle East Studies at Brandeis University.  He donated the initial $10 million gift that started the center in 2005.  He and the rest of his family are involved with the Crown Fellows program in American history at Brandeis, as well.

Political views
In a 2008 letter to voters Crown expressed his support for Barack Obama, the Democratic Presidential Candidate:

While my involvement in politics is motivated by a variety of issues, there is one issue that is fundamental: My deep commitment to Israel and to a strong U.S.-Israel relationship that strengthens both Israel's security and its efforts to seek peace," Crown wrote. "I am writing to share with you my confidence that Senator Barack Obama's stellar record on Israel gives me great comfort that, as President, he will be the friend to Israel that we all want to see in the White House - stalwart in his defense of Israel's security, and committed to helping Israel achieve peace with its neighbors."

In April 2013 Crown was a joint signatory on a letter to Israeli Prime Minister Benjamin Netanyahu urging him to "work closely" with Secretary of State John Kerry "to devise pragmatic initiatives, consistent with Israel's security needs, which would represent Israel's readiness to make painful territorial sacrifices for the sake of peace."

Awards 
Crown received the Golden Plate Award of the American Academy of Achievement in 1989. He was inducted as a Laureate of The Lincoln Academy of Illinois and awarded the Order of Lincoln (the State's highest honor) by the Governor of Illinois in 1999 in the area of Business and Social Service. Crown, alongside his wife, received the Blessed are the Peacemakers Award from Catholic Theological Union in 2012.

Personal life
In 1950, he married Renée Schine. His wife is the sister of producer G. David Schine and daughter of theater and hotel magnate, Junius Myer Schine. They have seven children: A. Steven Crown, James Crown, Patricia Crown, Susan Crown Kunkler, Daniel Crown, Sara Crown Star, and Janet Crown.

Their son James is the President of Henry Crown & Co.  A daughter, Janet, is founder and former owner of Burn 60 Fitness Studios. Among his seven children are board members of several major cultural institutions. Another daughter, Susan, is chairwoman of the Shoah Foundation. Together the family's net worth exceeds ten billion dollars, as of December 2020.

See also 
List of billionaires

References

External links
Forbes World's Richest People

1925 births
Living people
General Dynamics
American businesspeople
American people of Lithuanian-Jewish descent
Jewish American philanthropists
People from Wilmette, Illinois
American billionaires
Robert R. McCormick School of Engineering and Applied Science alumni
Harvard Business School alumni
Crown Family